The Duke of Argyll was a railway steamer passenger ship that operated in Europe from 1956 to 1975.

In service
Along with her sister ships the TSS Duke of Lancaster and the TSS Duke of Rothesay she was amongst the last passenger-only steamers built for British Railways (at that time, also a ferry operator). She was a replacement for the 1928 steamer built by the London Midland and Scottish Railway, RMS Duke of Argyll.

Built at Harland & Wolff, Belfast, launched on 12 January 1956 and making its maiden voyage on 27 September 1956, it was designed to operate as both a passenger ferry (primarily on the Heysham to Belfast route) and as a cruise ship.

Post Sealink
She operated as Neptunia for Libra Maritime from 1975 to 1987, then as Corinthia for Hellenic Maritime from 1987 to 1994.

She arrived in Hong Kong as Faith Power in 1994 and was renamed Fairy Princess in 1995 and then Zenith. In July 1995 she caught fire. The fire was extinguished and she was run aground. Later refloated, she was sold for scrap.

References

Passenger ships of the United Kingdom
Ferries of the United Kingdom
1956 ships
Ferries of Wales
Ships of British Rail
Ships built in Belfast
Ships built by Harland and Wolff
Maritime incidents in 1995